Anne-Christine Lang (born 10 August 1961) is a French politician who has been serving as a member of the National Assembly for Paris since 2014. A member of the Socialist Party (PS) until she joined La République En Marche! (LREM) in 2017, she first represented the 9th constituency as Jean-Marie Le Guen's substitute following his appointment as Secretary of State for Relations with Parliament by President François Hollande. In the 2017 legislative election, she ran in the neighbouring 10th constituency, which covers parts of the 13th and 14th arrondissements. Lang also served as a Councillor of Paris from 2001 until 2020.

Political career
In Parliament, Lang serves as member of the Committee on Cultural Affairs and Education. In this capacity, she was – alongside Fannette Charvier – her parliamentary group's rapporteur on l'école de la confiance, legislation introduced by Minister of National Education Jean-Michel Blanquer to restructure the French education system from nursery through to middle school. In 2020, Lang joined En commun (EC), a group within LREM led by Barbara Pompili.

Political positions
In July 2019, Lang decided not to align with her parliamentary group's majority and became one of 52 LREM members who abstained from a vote on the French ratification of the European Union’s Comprehensive Economic and Trade Agreement (CETA) with Canada.

For the 2020 Paris municipal election, Lang went against the party line and endorsed Cédric Villani over Benjamin Griveaux as candidate for the mayorship. 

In September 2020, Lang initiated a walkout of National Assembly members in protest of a woman in a hijab addressing a parliamentary commission. Lang said that as a feminist she could not accept the "mark of submission". In February 2022, she went against the party line again and was one of six LREM legislators who supported the Republicans’ motion for a ban on wearing hijabs in sports competitions.

Amid the COVID-19 pandemic in France, Lang led a group of 41 LREM deputies in March 2021 who proposed that, in order to mitigate the public distrust of the Oxford–AstraZeneca vaccine, politicians volunteer to get vaccinated.

Other activities
 Centre national des œuvres universitaires et scolaires (CNOUS), Member of the Board of Directors
 National Centre for Cinema and the Moving Image (CNC), Member of the Board of Directors

See also
 2017 French legislative election

References

1961 births
Living people
Deputies of the 14th National Assembly of the French Fifth Republic
Deputies of the 15th National Assembly of the French Fifth Republic
La République En Marche! politicians
21st-century French women politicians
People from Mont-de-Marsan
Women members of the National Assembly (France)
Councillors of Paris
Politicians from Nouvelle-Aquitaine